Feron Hunt (born July 5, 1999) is an American professional basketball player for the Birmingham Squadron of the NBA G League. He played college basketball for the SMU Mustangs.

High school career
Hunt moved from New Orleans to Texas as a sophomore in high school. He played basketball for DeSoto High School in DeSoto, Texas, averaging 11.2 points and 7.1 rebounds per game as a senior. Hunt first committed to playing college basketball for TCU but decommitted after one month. He later committed to SMU, choosing the Mustangs over Arkansas and Texas A&M, among others.

College career
On March 10, 2019, Hunt recorded 17 points and a career-high 14 rebounds in a 77–71 win against South Florida. As a freshman, he averaged 7.6 points and 6.4 rebounds per game. On February 12, 2020, Hunt posted a career-high 23 points and seven rebounds in a 79–75 win over UConn. As a sophomore, he averaged 11 points and 6.7 rebounds per game. Hunt declared for the 2020 NBA draft before withdrawing and returning to college. He considered sitting out his junior season to focus on social justice issues. On November 30, 2020, he scored a junior season-high 19 points in a 91–54 win against Texas A&M–Corpus Christi. Hunt averaged 11.1 points and 7.9 rebounds per game as a junior, earning Third Team All-American Athletic Conference honors. He declared for the 2021 NBA draft, opting to forgo his remaining college eligibility.

Professional career

Texas Legends (2021–2022)
After going undrafted in the 2021 NBA draft, Hunt joined the Dallas Mavericks for the NBA Summer League. On August 21, 2021, he signed with the Mavericks. However, he was waived on October 15. On October 23, he signed with the Texas Legends as an affiliate player. He averaged 15.9 points, 4.6 rebounds, 1.8 assists and 1.9 steals per game. 

On December 28, Hunt signed a 10-day contract with the New Orleans Pelicans via the hardship exemption. However, he did not play a game for the team. On January 7, 2022, Hunt was reacquired by the Texas Legends.

New York Knicks / Westchester Knicks (2022)
On March 18, 2022, Hunt signed a two-way contract with the New York Knicks. On November 29, 2022, the New York Knicks announced that they had waived Hunt. On November 30, 2022, Hunt was reacquired by the Westchester Knicks.

Birmingham Squadron (2022–present)
On December 5, 2022, the Birmingham Squadron announced that they had acquired Hunt from Westchester Knicks for the returning right to Justin Wright-Foreman and a second-round draft pick in 2023 NBA G League Draft.

Career statistics

NBA

|-
| style="text-align:left;"| 
| style="text-align:left;"| New York
| 2 || 0 || 4.0 || .000 || — || — || .5 || .5 || .5 || .0 || .0
|- class="sortbottom"
| style="text-align:center;" colspan="2"| Career
| 2 || 0 || 4.0 || .000 || — || — || .5 || .5 || .5 || .0 || .0

College

|-
| style="text-align:left;"| 2018–19
| style="text-align:left;"| SMU
| 32 || 8 || 23.5 || .554 || .250 || .691 || 6.4 || .7 || .8 || .9 || 7.6
|-
| style="text-align:left;"| 2019–20
| style="text-align:left;"| SMU
| 30 || 17 || 28.2 || .557 || .275 || .743 || 6.7 || 1.0 || .7 || .8 || 11.0
|-
| style="text-align:left;"| 2020–21
| style="text-align:left;"| SMU
| 16 || 16 || 28.2 || .560 || .200 || .733 || 7.9 || .6 || 1.1 || .9 || 11.1
|- class="sortbottom"
| style="text-align:center;" colspan="2"| Career
| 78 || 41 || 26.3 || .557 || .250 || .724 || 6.8 || .8 || .8 || .9 || 9.6

References

External links
SMU Mustangs bio

1999 births
Living people
American men's basketball players
Basketball players from New Orleans
Basketball players from Texas
New York Knicks players
People from DeSoto, Texas
Power forwards (basketball)
Small forwards
SMU Mustangs men's basketball players
Texas Legends players
Undrafted National Basketball Association players
Westchester Knicks players